Angela V. McKnight (born March 10, 1977) is an American Democratic Party politician who has represented the 31st Legislative District in the New Jersey General Assembly since she was sworn into office on January 12, 2016.

A resident of Jersey City, New Jersey, McKnight received a bachelor's degree from the University of Phoenix with a major in business management. She is the founder and chief executive officer of AngelaCARES, an advocacy and support organization for senior citizens.

As a member of the General Assembly, McKnight has been appointed to serve on the Education Committee, the Health and Senior Services Committee and the Human Services Committee.

Under the terms of a bill introduced by McKnight in the General Assembly in 2019, students would be required to demonstrate proficiency in the use of cursive handwriting, both reading and writing, by the end of the third grade. McKnight cited the bill as providing children with "a vital skill they will need for the rest of their lives", noting that without cursive skills "how will our students ever know how to read a scripted font on a word document, or even sign the back of a check".

District 31 
Each of the 40 districts in the New Jersey Legislature has one representative in the New Jersey Senate and two members in the New Jersey General Assembly. The representatives from the 31st District for the 2022—23 Legislative Session are:
Senator Sandra Bolden Cunningham
Assemblywoman Angela V. McKnight
Assemblyman William Sampson

References

External links
Assemblywoman McKnight's legislative web page, New Jersey Legislature
New Jersey Legislature financial disclosure forms
2015

1977 births
Living people
African-American state legislators in New Jersey
African-American women in politics
Democratic Party members of the New Jersey General Assembly
Politicians from Jersey City, New Jersey
University of Phoenix alumni
Women state legislators in New Jersey
21st-century American politicians
21st-century American women politicians
21st-century African-American women
21st-century African-American politicians
20th-century African-American people
20th-century African-American women